Glauce Rocha (16 August 1930 – 12 October 1971) was a Brazilian actress. She appeared in 34 films and television shows between 1950 and 1971. She starred in the film Os Cafajestes, which was entered into the 12th Berlin International Film Festival.

Selected filmography
 Os Cafajestes (1962)
 Entranced Earth (1967)

References

External links

1930 births
1971 deaths
Brazilian film actresses
Brazilian television actresses
20th-century Brazilian actresses